Giles Estcourt (died 1587), was an English politician.

He was a Member (MP) of the Parliament of England for Salisbury in 1563, 1571, 1572, 1584 and 1586.

References

Year of birth missing
1587 deaths
English MPs 1563–1567
English MPs 1571
English MPs 1572–1583
English MPs 1584–1585
English MPs 1586–1587